The Waltons is an American television series that aired for nine seasons (1972–1981) on CBS. A further six TV movies aired in the 1980s and 1990s. Below is a list of the series characters and the actors who played them.

Main characters

John "John-Boy" Walton Jr.
John Walton Jr. (Richard Thomas, pilot, seasons 1–5, two guest shots in season 6; and three 1990s movies; Robert Wightman, seasons 8–9, 1982 movies). This first Walton child is known throughout the series as "John-Boy," is born in 1916, is the eldest son and child of Olivia Walton (née Daly) and John Walton Sr. John-Boy is based on author Earl Hamner Jr., who narrates the opening and closing of each episode as the present day adult John-Boy. The main character of the series, who is also the oldest of seven surviving children, aged 17 in season one (15 in the pilot), John-Boy is a serious thinker and avid reader with a passion to become a writer. He constantly records his thoughts about his family, friends, and circumstances, and writes stories in a journal/diary. Normally a calm, quiet sort, John-Boy occasionally displays a touch of his father's and brother Ben's fiery tempers, and can become defensive and indignant when a situation warrants it. He is sensitive and empathetic with a drive to succeed in his chosen profession. He is deeply touched by tragic events, such as when watching the Hindenburg disaster unfold and being injured trying to rescue people from it. Prior to World War II breaking out, John-Boy is the only member of his family seriously concerned about the rise of Adolf Hitler, and is infuriated when his community attempts to burn German books in response to hearing about Nazis doing the same to American books. After becoming the first member of his family to graduate from college, he moves to New York City to fulfill his dream of becoming an author. After the attack on Pearl Harbor, he enlists in the military and writes as a war correspondent for the U.S. Army's newspaper Stars and Stripes.

In season 8, he is formally reintroduced to the story once his parents learn he is missing in action. For weeks, John-Boy's location and condition are unknown to his family. Unbeknownst to them, his plane, the Katey Anne, was shot down and crashed into the sea near Britain while he was out looking for war stories. He and the pilot were forced to tread water for hours at a time to stay afloat, but after growing exhausted, his comrade succumbed to his injuries and drowned, while John-Boy, who had suffered extreme head trauma, lost consciousness as he was rescued from the sea. Due to the severity of his injuries, he slipped into a lengthy coma and was flown back to America to undergo medical care, leaving his parents to wait on his recovery. When he at last emerged from his coma, he was stricken with slight amnesia from the traumatic injury he suffered to his head, and no longer could participate in the war. 

After World War II ended, he tried to return to New York at the promise of an opportunity waiting for him to tell his story, like many other veterans, but lack of demand for wartime books due to an over-saturated market of war stories knocked his story from publishers' consideration. He returned to Walton's Mountain to briefly teach courses in the new television department at fictional Boatwright University. John-Boy then turned his attention to reporting news instead and gained a steady means of living once more, but would one day have to break the news of the John F. Kennedy assassination. It was in this profession that he finally found the love of his life in the form of Janet, and they eventually married. Their first children were twins, born during the Easter special.

John Walton Sr.
Family patriarch John, called Daddy by his children, (pilot, Andrew Duggan; series and sequels, Ralph Waite) is a hard-working, industrious man who runs a small family sawmill on his property on Walton's Mountain. He is the second son of Esther Walton (née Morgan) and Zebulon Tyler Walton. He is the husband of Olivia Walton (née Daly) and father of John "John-Boy" Walton Jr., Jason Walton, Mary Ellen Walton, Erin Esther Walton, Benjamin "Ben" Walton II, James Robert "Jim-Bob" Walton and his stillborn twin brother Joseph Zebulon Walton, and Elizabeth Tyler Walton. He is usually good natured, wise, and fearless, ready to stand up to a challenge and tell things straight. These personality traits sometimes cause him to be stern with his children and wife on occasion, and when greatly stressed he is prone to "workaholism." John deeply loves and respects his wife, and calls her “Liv” or “Livie.”

John graduated high school in 1911 (implying he had been born about 1893) and served in World War I. John will do anything to protect his family; he also wishes to see all of his children graduate from college, which he was unable to do. Despite his Baptist upbringing he, like his father Zeb, is ambivalent toward organized religion and otherwise agnostic. He holds life sacred. He does not approve of hunting animals for sport, but will hunt to provide food for his family. Despite his rejection of the Baptist church (we later learn he never underwent baptism during his lifetime), his wife calls him "the most God-fearing man I know." 

We are told in the pilot movie that he dies in the year 1969 (the year in which Earl Hamner's father died).

In 2004, TV Guide ranked him # 3 on its "50 Greatest TV Dads of All Time" list.

Olivia Daly Walton
Olivia, also known as Liv, Livie, or Mama, (pilot, Patricia Neal; series, Michael Learned) is John Walton's soft-spoken, patient, loving wife, who complements his tough-skinned, opinionated nature. She is the sister of Frances Daly of Edgemont. She has seven living children: John Walton Jr., Jason Walton, Mary Ellen Walton, Erin Esther Walton, Benjamin Walton II, James Robert Walton, and Elizabeth Tyler Walton. An eighth child, Jim-Bob's twin brother Joseph Zebulon Walton, died at birth. Olivia also suffered a miscarriage in season two. She is usually gentle but firm and unafraid to speak up or administer discipline when needed. She especially hates being in debt. Like her mother-in-law Esther Walton, she is a devout Southern Baptist, although her husband doesn't share her commitment to the organized religion of the church. Her Baptist faith extends to the home, and she punishes the children by telling them to read a chapter from the Bible. She is willing to open her home to friends or strangers in need, but, during early seasons, is uncomfortable with her family associating with the Baldwin sisters because she strongly disapproves of their unknowing production of homemade liquor (moonshine), which they refer to as "Papa's Recipe," She is especially disturbed to learn that John-Boy borrows an antique typewriter from them and that Mary Ellen unknowingly sells it to the traveling junk dealer, as she won't have her family indebted to the Baldwins. (Olivia, along with the rest of the Walton's Mountain community, more warmly embraces the Baldwin sisters during later seasons.) Though she is mostly grounded and content with her life, Olivia also displays a dreamy side of her personality and a thirst for novelty, as seen, for example, in “The Airmail Man” (season two) where she dreams of flying in an airplane, and in “The Rebellion” (season five) when she gets a perm. She is also a natural artist.  After John's brother Ben was killed in World War I, she resolved to never see another family member off to war and declined to be present when Mary Ellen's husband Curt shipped out for active duty. When her own sons got involved in the war as a result of the Pearl Harbor attack, she changed her mind.

Her background and family are not referenced to the same degree as John's. It is known that she displayed budding artistic talent in high school and considered going to college on a scholarship but instead chose to marry John Walton when she was 16 and settle down as a homemaker. It is implied she had John-Boy within a year or so of her marriage, setting her birth year around 1897-98.

She is content that she made the right choice to become a wife and mother.

She survives polio in a two-hour special at the end of the first season, and develops tuberculosis later in the series.

Olivia overcomes her health challenges and becomes an active senior citizen; in the final reunion movie she is working as a school teacher at the Walton's Mountain school where daughter Erin has become principal. It is implied Olivia completed college courses to qualify for this job.

In a 1999 Archive of American Television interview, executive producer Earl Hamner Jr. stated that, when transitioning from the film to the TV series, he chose to recast the role of Olivia because he did not think that Patricia Neal's health would allow her to commit to the grind of a weekly television series. In her 1979 memoir, Neal suggested that she would have accepted the role, had it been offered to her.

Zebulon Tyler Walton
The Walton family elder, Grandpa Walton (Pilot, Edgar Bergen; seasons 1–6, Will Geer), husband of Esther Walton (née Morgan), and father of Benjamin Walton, who was killed in World War I, John Walton, Sr., and an unknown Walton child (early in the first season, Zeb is showing John Boy military medals stored in a trunk, and mentions that they belonged to John Boy's Uncle "Matt" (S1E5). It can be logically assumed that since the medals are in Zeb's possession, rather than Olivia's parents, that this is the name of the third child, and that since they are military in nature, like Ben the elder, he never made it home from the great war.)  Referred to as "Zeb" to friends, "Zeb" or "old man" by his wife Esther (who in turn is lovingly referred to as "old woman" or “old girl”), "Pa" by his son John, "Grandpa" by Olivia and the rest of the family, and "the Grandfather" in show credits, likes to spend his time working with John in the sawmill, fishing, and playing with and teaching his grandkids. As hardworking as son John, Grandpa is much more easygoing in general and has a mischievous yet wise and vibrant personality. An example of this was in one episode, when one of his grandchildren tried smoking and he caught them, and got them to stop the same way his father taught him: he had the boys smoke cigarettes, one after another, until they were sick. Grandma, John Sr., and Olivia didn't approve of his methods. He especially cherishes his wife (and vice versa), although he can often be found alone relaxing with the Baldwin sisters, happily sipping their "Recipe" (moonshine). He also tends to distrust his wife's Baptist church, although he has a deep love and respect for God. He served in the Spanish–American War (although he dramatized his involvement by telling tall tales to his grandchild despite Esther's indignation at the very idea) and is an amateur botanist like Will Geer himself. He has the habit of making ornate prayers at the dinner table and sometimes ends them with "awomen" in respect to "amen", and dislikes the use of the phrase, "The Civil War", preferring "The War Between the States". Esther often complained about his rotund figure and tried to get him to diet, worrying about his heart. This was exemplified in the episode "The Birthday"; as he was about to turn 73, he suffered a major heart attack and was bedridden for weeks on end. He often claimed that he would live to 101, but in the end, he suffered a second and final heart attack three years later, missing his goal by about a quarter of a century.

Geer's death from respiratory failure during the post-season-six hiatus is reflected in the opening episode of the seventh season. It is learned that Grandpa had suddenly died while planting seedlings on Walton's Mountain and was buried on the mountain with a simple headstone plate reading: ZEBULON WALTON 1865–1941. During the remainder of the series, and at least three of the reunion specials, he is frequently remembered by other characters; a photo of Geer hanging in the Walton living room is often visible to viewers, and sometimes even moves, which Esther takes as a sign of his spirit interacting with the photo and letting the rest of the family know he is still with them.

In the German dubbed version, the name of Zebulon "Zeb" Walton was changed to Samuel "Sam" Walton. The television network ZDF which first aired The Waltons in Germany was worried that the name "Zeb" could be mistaken with "Sepp" which is a Bavarian short form of the name Joseph and could be seen as being a cliché.

Esther Walton
Grandma (Ellen Corby), practical but feisty, quick-tempered and devout. "Grandma" Esther (née Morgan), is the wife of Zebulon Tyler ("Grandpa" Zeb) Walton and the mother of Benjamin "Ben" Walton (who was killed in World War I); John Walton Sr., husband of Olivia (née Daly); and their unknown sibling, presumably Matthew. Like her husband, Grandma has plenty of wisdom to share with family and friends, peppered with the occasional "Good Lord!" (when surprised, indignant, or both) or bestowing a cheekily-loving "You old fool!" on her husband. In her youth, she was nicknamed "Sissy" and had the dream of becoming a seamstress and opening her own business in Charlottesville [Season 2, Episode 15: The Awakening, revealed to John Boy by Zeb], and Zeb often wonders if she found happiness in lieu of her dreams not amounting to much over time. In 1977, Ellen Corby's real life stroke was incorporated into the storyline and forced her to leave the show for a long period of recovery. Unfortunately, the effects of her stroke impaired her ability to speak cohesively and severely limited her dialogue thereafter, making it difficult for her character to communicate without having to convey her feelings through the voices of other characters indicating what she wants to say or do for her, or for her to physically write out her feelings. Corby's absence from the latter half of season five, and having her role drastically reduced from then on, was explained as Grandma frequently visiting relations in nearby Buckingham County. Corby was able to return for the sixth season's finale; she returned to being a regular cast member during season seven, though Corby's health forced her to drop to recurring status from season eight onward, only appearing in a few episodes per season; she appeared in five of the six reunion specials. An older John-Boy would go on to mention that "both of my grandparents are no longer alive", suggesting that Esther died in the later future, but no earlier than 1969 (the same year her son John was said to have died). Her third child was never mentioned by name nor seen in the series.  (Correction:  In the first season Zeb is seen showing John-Boy medals in a trunk, belonging to John-Boy's "Uncle Matt".  S1E5)

Jason Walton
Jason (Jon Walmsley) was born in the winter of 1918, second son and child of John ("Daddy") Walton  and Olivia ("Mama," Liv) Walton (née Daly); grandson of Zebulon Tyler ("Grandpa" Zeb) Walton and Esther ("Grandma") Walton (née Morgan); nephew of Benjamin ("Uncle" Ben) Walton, an unknown aunt or uncle Walton, and Frances Daly who lives in Edgemont; brother of John-Boy Walton, Mary Ellen Walton, Benjamin (Ben) Walton, Erin Esther Walton, James Robert (Jim-Bob) Walton and his stillborn twin brother Joseph Zebulon Walton, and Elizabeth Tyler Walton, 1st Cousin of Olivia, and cousin-in-law of Bob Hill. Jason has a good relationship with all his siblings, but is especially close to his older brother John-Boy. Though the two brothers have very different personalities and interests, they get along very well. The two became very close when John-Boy began college and their bond grew even stronger as the years went by. Age 15 in season one, he is a somewhat-introverted but good-natured musician who enjoys composing music for harmonica, guitar, and piano, some of which graced the show. He is a favorite of the Baldwin sisters, who often ask him to play the piano and sing for them. In season three, Jason attends the Kleinberg Conservatory of Music; in season four he lands a job playing  honkytonk piano at local tavern The Dew Drop Inn (which he later comes to own), much to Grandma's and Olivia's chagrin. In season five, Jason joins the National Guard to earn some extra money. In season seven, after the attack on Pearl Harbor, he struggles with the idea of killing another man and considers becoming a conscientious objector. He ultimately decides against this, and by season eight he joins the Army and is promoted to the rank of sergeant. While stationed as a drill instructor in the fictitious Camp Rockfish near Walton's Mountain, he meets a beautiful WAC sergeant, Antoinette “Toni” Hazelton, who is also musically talented. Though Jason initially gets on Toni's nerves, they eventually fall in love and marry. They have several children, all named after country singers of the time.

Mary Ellen Walton-Willard-Jones
Mary Ellen (Judy Norton Taylor) is the eldest of Olivia and John's daughters and third child, born in April 1920, aged 13 in season one. Throughout the first few seasons, she is a stubborn, sometimes rebellious teenager who believes others don't understand her. While something of a tomboy who enjoyed playing baseball, Mary Ellen was also prone to melodrama and vanity, engaging in a rivalry with “rich girl” Martha Rose Coverdale for the affections of the awkward but warm-hearted G.W. Haines (David Doremus). Mary Ellen matures into a much wiser young woman and her childish fantasy of becoming a movie star gives way for a more reasonable and realistic ambition to go into medicine after reading up on it and developing an interest. Mary Ellen was also influenced by the county nurse, Nora Jones. She then works to gain an education as a medical worker, and becomes a nurse. However, when she ends up taking care of the people out in the country by herself, she concludes they need more medical expertise than she can offer them and continues studying medicine until she succeeds in becoming a fully-fledged doctor. Even though some people frowned upon the idea of female doctors and she receives mixed support from her family, she refuses to let this stop her.  Mary Ellen has a special relationship with each of her six siblings, but over the years grows especially close with her younger sister Erin. 

In season five, Mary Ellen marries Dr. Curtis Willard (Curt), the town's new physician, and breaks off a prior engagement to medical intern David Spencer that she had rushed in to. In season six, they welcome a son, John Curtis Willard. In season seven, Mary Ellen receives a telegram notifying her that Curt has been killed in the attack on Pearl Harbor, but in season nine she learns he is still alive, using an assumed name. When she journeys to find him, she discovers that he has changed a lot, including being unable to engage in sexual relations on account of his injuries, and realizes that trying to continue their relationship is pointless because the war has traumatized him to the point of losing nearly all of his compassion and his desires. Mary Ellen finally lets go of Curt upon seeing he no longer wants to be a doctor or a husband, but keeps him as a friend who still shows affection towards their baby. She divorces him and finds a new beau, Jonesy, whom she met during the time she believed Curt had been killed and whom she had nearly married beforehand. Although this engagement is threatened once, she ends up marrying him in the second reunion movie, Mother's Day on Walton's Mountain. During their honeymoon, she has an accident and is told she cannot have more children, but by the fourth reunion movie, she has had two more, Clay and Katie, by Jonesy (who does not appear). In the "Walton Thanksgiving Reunion," set in 1963, Mary Ellen is called a "war widow," indicating that the divorce-shy have adopted an honorific white lie on her behalf.

Benjamin "Ben" Walton
Ben (Eric Scott) is named for his father John's brother Ben, who was killed in France during World War I. Born in 1921, Fourth-born Ben seems to get into trouble at precisely the wrong times and possesses fiery red hair and a temper to match. He has a bright mind and an entrepreneurial spirit but sometimes falls for get-rich-quick schemes and needs his father or John-Boy to bail him out. Even as an adult, running the sawmill in partnership with his father, he makes deals that don't turn out well. As an adolescent, he takes many jobs and strives to prove his maturity to the family, who he believed looked on him as a “child.” Underneath his quick temper and bravado, Ben is a kind, compassionate person who cares very deeply for his family.  He elopes with sweet, pretty Cindy Brunson and together they have two children, daughter Virginia (Ginny) and son Charles Benjamin (Charlie), who was born in the second reunion movie. In season eight, Ben joins the Seabees and is taken prisoner by the Japanese. He and a fellow soldier, Norm, are taken to American troops during the episode “The Last Ten Days” (season nine) by a Japanese prison guard, who surrendered to them to preserve his life. Ben then returns home. At various times, Ben has run the mill with his father, Elizabeth's boyfriend Drew, and Erin's husband Paul Northridge. In the fourth reunion movie, it is revealed that Ben and Cindy lost Ginny in a drowning accident and that they are considering adopting another child (Charlie is never seen nor mentioned). Their heartbreak at losing their child and the emptiness that followed nearly tore them apart, but both of them tearfully admitted they needed to move on and find a new child to love, causing Ben to accept the idea of adoption after much resistance.

Erin Esther Walton Northridge
Erin (Mary Elizabeth McDonough), the fifth-born child and second daughter of Olivia Walton (née Daly) and John Walton Sr. Erin grows very close to her older sister Mary Ellen, though they often fight, especially in the early seasons. As a child, Erin can be prissy and a tattletale. She aspires to become a wife and mother, in direct contrast to Mary Ellen's ambitions. As she matures, Erin becomes an effective manager and a bright worker. Erin is considered the pretty one in the family, not the scholar, and she falls in love many times throughout her teenage years. She works as a telephone operator early in season five while she is finishing high school. She graduates in 1937, and her age is mentioned as sixteen years old in the episode “The Elopement”. She struggles to find her place, as she is not as musical like Jason, not an academic like John-Boy, and not interested in medicine like Mary Ellen. She takes a part-time job at a business college to buy a typewriter for John-Boy when the owner sees her answering and assisting callers at the unattended front desk. She is allowed to work her way through the business school and later becomes the executive secretary to Mr. Pringle, and then personnel manager to loudmouthed businessman J.D. Pickett, a defense plant owner during the war. Later, she becomes the plant's assistant manager. 

Almost all of Erin's romances are ill-fated: the object of her affections either dies or proves to have poor character. Eventually she meets and marries Paul Northridge; they have three children: Susan, Amanda, and Peter. It is later revealed (in the fourth of the six post-series reunion movies) that they are divorced as Paul had become unfaithful. Erin has earned a teaching certificate, and by the final reunion movie she is a school principal.

James Robert "Jim-Bob" Walton
James Robert (David W. Harper), better known as Jim-Bob, is the youngest Walton boy and sixth child of John and Olivia Walton. He and Joseph Zebulon were born on January 13, 1924, but only he survived as his twin was stillborn. Jim-Bob is the only Walton child who was born in a hospital, rather than at home. As a teenager, he passes his older brother Ben in height. He is particularly close to his younger sister Elizabeth. He is fascinated by airplanes and aspires to become a pilot; however, increasingly poor eyesight forces him to give up this dream. Due to his passion for the Air Corps, Jim-Bob is compelled to get a tattoo of their insignia, which he later regrets. He eventually becomes a mechanic and opens his own business just opposite Ike's general store. As he grows up, he collects scrap parts to build his own car which tends to break down from its ramshackle construction. After being unable to decide on the color, he paints it yellow which Elizabeth teasingly suggests. While he and Jody are joyriding in the throes of post-war glee, his car is in a crash outside a pool hall. He sells the vehicle to compensate for the damages and plans to build another. Jim-Bob has several girlfriends throughout the series, including Ike and Corabeth's adopted daughter (and Elizabeth's friend and adoptive cousin) Aimee Godsey and a foreign woman who feigned pregnancy to trick him into marrying her and just as quickly was sent out of his life (though John-Boy wonders if Jim-Bob is still seeing her in secret and not telling the rest of his family), but he never truly settles down with anybody to the knowledge of his family. Instead, he becomes a hermit living in an airplane hangar right next to an adjacent airfield where he sometimes offers to fly people around and routinely works on planes. Jim-Bob's birth date is another example of timeline error in the series: Trying to enlist in the military after the Pearl Harbor attack, he's told that he's too young. If his birth date was January 1923, he would have been going-on-19 in December 1941.  Later he is shown graduating as valedictorian of the Class of 1944 in episode 188 "The Valedictorian." However, in the season three episode "The Runaway," he mentions that his birth date is June 13, 1924.

Elizabeth Tyler Walton Cutler
Elizabeth (Kami Cotler) is the youngest child of John and Olivia Walton.  She was born in fall 1927 and age 6 when the series began.  By the end of season five, John-Boy refers to Elizabeth as 12 and small for her age. She has her 13th birthday in season seven's Halloween episode. She is free-spirited and outspoken, but sensitive, and in later seasons she's shown to share John-Boy's love of reading and knack for writing. Her best friend, Aimee Godsey, is the adopted daughter of her father's second cousin, Corabeth, and general store owner, Ike Godsey. As a teenager, Elizabeth often babysits her nieces and nephews. Later she travels in Europe and gets into a relationship that dissolves right as she plans to get married; she joins the Peace Corps in one of the sequel movies. Tony Becker portrays her boyfriend Drew, who goes through a failed marriage in spite of not getting together with Elizabeth when she goes off to Europe, leading them to rekindle their original romantic feelings like they really wanted to; in the final sequel movie, she and Drew get engaged.

Ike Godsey
A close friend of the Walton family and second cousin-in-law of John Walton Sr., Isaac B. "Ike" Godsey (pilot, Woodrow Parfrey; series, Joe Conley) is the proprietor of the general store, the postmaster, and only garage mechanic in Walton's Mountain until teenage Jim-Bob Walton opens a garage across the road from the Mercantile. Ike has a kind heart, and often lets people have anything they want on credit, and pay him back whenever they can, much to the disapproval of Corabeth. This is a constant source of friction and arguments. She tends to refuse people credit when Ike is out on business, and even while he is watching. Unfortunately for Ike, Corabeth doesn't agree with the way the store is run, so she takes it upon herself to do it herself, believing she can run the store better than Ike. After Corabeth refuses to listen to Ike, he has no option but to speak to John and Olivia about his problem and to ask them to speak to her. He is a World War I veteran, having served alongside John Walton and Sheriff Bridges. During World War II, he serves as the town's Civil Defense warden. He offers the use of extra space in the Mercantile as a classroom when a fanatic burns down the schoolhouse. He eventually marries John's distant cousin Corabeth and they adopt a daughter, Aimee. Later on, Ike suffers a heart attack brought on by stress and is forced to limit his activities as shopkeeper. He is implied to pass away many years later when an older John-Boy remarks that "Ike's gone now." In Season 8, Episode 22 ("The Furlough"), his full name is revealed as Isaac Aloysius Godsey, after a clerical error at an Army induction center transposed numbers in his birth date, which was revealed as September 24, 1901.

Corabeth Walton Godsey
In season three, John's second cousin Corabeth Walton (Ronnie Claire Edwards) arrives in Walton's Mountain after her mother's death. After years of caring for her invalid parents, Corabeth is nervous and shy and has retreated into a shell. She holds some resentment toward her sister, Orma Lee (Edwards in a dual role), who left Corabeth to care for their parents and has since married four times. Olivia and Esther encourage her and build her self-esteem so she can express her interest in storekeeper/family friend Ike Godsey. They eventually marry and adopt a daughter, Aimee Louise. Whether they marry out of love or mutual loneliness is explored throughout the series. Marriage and motherhood cause Corabeth to flower into an eccentric, self-refined aspiring socialite—and the town busybody. She deals with several private battles: alcoholism, depression, temptation to infidelity, and her intense longing to forever abandon the rural backwater for a more cultured, cosmopolitan life. In later seasons she dresses in a flamboyant, urban manner with trendy hairstyles and bold dresses and suits, out of place with the Walton women and the conservative rural area. She is innovative, and improves the yard goods and millinery departments at Godsey's store. Humorously, she always addresses her husband as "Mr. Godsey" except for intimate private moments. Despite her desire to live someplace other than Walton's Mountain, Corabeth does seem to genuinely like and care for the Walton family. She regards Olivia as a friend, and attempts to help Jim-Bob with his studies, encouraging him to follow his dreams. Later in the series she becomes a real-estate agent for the area.

Cindy Brunson Walton
Ben's passionate love interest, introduced in the season 7 episode "Day of Infamy;" played by Robin Eisenman.  Leslie Winston played Cindy from 1979 to 1981. She drives a characteristic red car and has a provocative reputation that earned her the nickname "Sinful Cindy" based on people's surface judgments of her. The real Cindy is sweet, caring, spirited, and hardworking. Ben suddenly decided to elope with her without consulting his family, which made them worry that he hadn't thought the decision through, but the couple proved to be sound as they became the parents of a healthy baby girl, Virginia, named after Cindy's home. When Ben becomes one of the Seabees, Cindy endures raising a child alone and having limited contact with her husband. During World War II's final days, Ben is taken prisoner by Japanese soldiers and Cindy has a vision warning her of this danger, but the atomic bombings in Japan result in his release from captivity and safe return home.

Cindy's parentage is a sensitive topic for her. When she was little her mother became ill and died, which greatly upset her, and she becomes angry whenever people show disrespect for their mothers, or disregard for their children, she becomes angry. In the season 9 episode "The Carousel," her father was caught in a storm while driving out to see her. He ran off the road and wrecked his car in the poor visibility, which caused his death. At his funeral, a mysterious woman appeared among the crowd, triggering memories from Cindy's early childhood. She learned that she had been adopted at birth. She investigated the matter further until she was able to make contact with the woman again and discover that this was her biological mother, who had been forced to give her up because Cindy's father had died before she was born and she wasn't able to raise a child alone. Later she married, and her husband figured out that she had a child out there somewhere. He lovingly responded to an ad in the papers Cindy placed to find her mother, and although the woman was remorseful about the situation and reluctant to claim her daughter, Cindy wanted her back in her life and the two reconciled. In a case of dramatic irony, Cindy would end up considering adoption after a tragic event caused her own daughter to drown, which drove her to the brink of despair. When she expressed a longing to take in a family-less child, Ben decided that he could learn to love such a child as much as she would.

Rose Burton Perkins
Rose Burton (Peggy Rea) is a Walton cousin who was introduced in season 8.  After Esther's role in the series begins to diminish and the Walton children are grown up, she and her grandchildren Jeffrey and Serena show up at their house looking for a place to stay, and Rose is desperate to find a safe haven from their old residence in Baltimore. Rose's husband Burt Burton, a train conductor, has long since died and their son, who is enlisted in the military, also lost his spouse. Without his wife to help raise his children, he lapsed into alcoholism and became horribly abusive to his children; after he hit Jeffrey with a belt, Rose immediately took her grandchildren as far away from their father as she could even though it pained her to never want to see her own son again. 

Rose often mentions her old beau Stanley Perkins, a dancer whom she met before Burt. Eventually, Stanley reenters her life and proposes to her on two occasions. The second time, Rose discovers she has a weak heart and won't be able to travel around like he does. When Stanley insists that his love for her is greater than his desire to travel, they marry and go on a honeymoon.

Towards the end of the series, Rose moves in to help John, Mary Ellen, Erin, and Elizabeth with the housekeeping and cooking while John-Boy, Jason, Ben, and Jim-Bob are away at war.

The character briefly appears in the 1993 reunion special, A Walton Thanksgiving Reunion, (set in 1963), as an employee of Erin's former in-laws, the Northridge family.

Dr. Curtis Willard (Curt)

Played by Tom Bower in the episodes leading up to the December 7, 1941 Attack on Pearl Harbor.  Curt comes to the community to replace Dr. Vance, and quickly falls in love with Mary Ellen and marries her. Curt leaves the town when called up to service in the years preceding World War 2. Mary Ellen is planning to head to Hawaii to be with Curt when the attack by the Japanese occurs in December 1941. Declared a military casualty in the attack, he later shows up alive, played by Scott Hylands.  He is found living in Florida under the name Curtis Packer.

Recurring characters

Mamie Baldwin
The older of the Baldwin sisters, a pair of relatively well-off elderly spinster Southern belles, Mamie (pilot, Josephine Hutchinson; series, Helen Kleeb) is more sensible and grounded than her sister Emily. She and Emily carry on their father's legacy of making and distributing a product they refer to as "Papa's recipe" (or "the Recipe"), which they believe to be a harmless elixir and medicinal remedy, but which is in fact moonshine whiskey which they make using "Papa's machine" (a still). All the residents of Walton's Mountain are aware of the true nature of the recipe, but rarely discuss it with the sisters. Olivia and Grandma Walton, being devout tee-totaler Baptists, disapprove of the sisters' production of alcohol and generally try to discourage the family's association with them early in the series. However, in later seasons the Baldwin sisters become dear family friends, even taking in Jason following a devastating fire at the Waltons' home. In one episode later in the series Grandma Walton teaches Elizabeth how to bake and lets on that her secret to a particular cake tasting so good was using some of 'the recipe' in the cake mix, and during the eighth season, when Miss Mamie is too afraid to undergo cataract surgery to restore her failing vision, Grandma helps to persuade her to have the surgery. Prohibition has been repealed early in Roosevelt's presidency, and though the operation of an unlicensed still (as well as the selling of untaxed alcohol) is technically illegal, Sheriff Bridges considers the ladies' activities generally harmless as long as no one tries to sell the "recipe" (which a couple of their unscrupulous relatives try to do). Most of the other citizens of Walton's Mountain are quite fond of the Baldwin sisters.

Emily Baldwin
Emily Baldwin (pilot, Dorothy Stickney; series, Mary Jackson) is the slightly more eccentric Baldwin Sister. As a young girl, she was in love with handsome Ashley Longworth, until he disappeared. This was due to her father's interference, of which Emily was unaware until her sixties. Though she has never heard from Ashley for some fifty years, she is convinced that he will someday return to her. In season seven, Ashley's son Ashley Jr. (Jonathan Frakes), shows up at Walton's Mountain with news that his father has died (but also that he loved Miss Emily for the remainder of his life).  Ashley Jr. begins a romance with Erin Walton, to Emily's delight, but reveals that, on account of his wartime experiences, is an atheist, and Erin, on the advice of her mother, Olivia, breaks off the relationship.  He returns after Erin is involved with Paul Northridge, creating a love triangle, and forcing Erin to choose between two suitors. (Erin ends up choosing Paul Northridge.)

Aimee Godsey
Aimee (series & A Walton Thanksgiving Reunion, Rachel Longaker; Mother's Day on Waltons Mountain & A Day for Thanks on Waltons Mountain, DeAnna Robbins) is the adopted daughter of Ike and Corabeth Godsey and best friend of Elizabeth Walton. Her parents died when she was young and the Godseys were compelled to adopt her after Corabeth had trouble becoming pregnant. Corabeth tries to tailor Aimee into a proper lady of culture and refinement even though she would rather be an ordinary country girl who enjoys the latest fashions and gets to adventure places. By season eight, her character no longer makes regular appearances on the show, and is said to have been placed in private school until returning in the reunion movies. In the fourth reunion movie, it comes to light that Aimee disobeyed her mother's wishes and got involved with someone she considered to be a ruffian, leading to many years of estrangement between the two of them. However, Aimee returns to Walton's Mountain now married to this man, with a baby, and the sight of her new grandchild is enough to touch Corabeth's heart and mend the rift between them, having admitted her mistake.

Rev. Matthew Fordwick
First appearing early in the first season ("The Sinner"), Rev. Matthew Fordwick (John Ritter) comes to the community fresh from Baptist seminary trained as a hardline Biblical legalist, until he accidentally gets himself drunk at a visit with the Baldwin sisters, who happen to be his distant cousins.  This humbling experience causes him to adopt a more forgiving nature, and he serves as the pastor of the local Baptist church through season five.  He marries the schoolteacher, Rosemary Hunter, in season four.

Rosemary Hunter Fordwick
Miss Hunter (Mariclare Costello) is Walton's Mountain's schoolteacher, teaching all ages from first grade through high school. As such, she teaches nearly all the county's children, including all of the Waltons. She is one of the first people to encourage John-Boy to pursue his writing, suggesting he submit his essays to various competitions, and helping him prepare for college. She later marries Rev. Matthew Fordwick. Together, they have a daughter named Mary Margret after Mary Ellen.

Verdie Grant Foster
Verdie Grant (Lynn Hamilton), is a middle-aged African-American widow (née Harris), with two adult sons and three daughters, the youngest of whom, Claire, is graduating from college in Richmond, and later suffers a failed marriage for her education. She has been illiterate most of her life, a fact which her fierce pride and mistrust based on bad experience with a white-dominated society has caused her to hide. But she decides to ask John-Boy to secretly teach her to read and write. After resolution of a misunderstanding caused by Elizabeth unknowingly revealing her secret to Miss Hunter, she completes her lessons and becomes a close friend of the Waltons, appearing in a total of 17 episodes. During later seasons, she marries Harley Foster (Hal Williams), an itinerant laborer (who it is later revealed was on the run trying to avoid conviction for a murder which he had not committed) and becomes stepmother to Harley's young son. The other of her sons, Josh, was an orphan who wandered onto Walton's mountain and the Fosters fell in love with and adopted. After her father died before she could ask him about his past, Verdie discovered an ornamental necklace among his belongings, sparking a desire to learn more about her heritage and ancestry, despite her husband's warnings not to pry into the ugliness of a bygone time. Because of the flood that hit the mountains years ago, she nearly lost the trail of her ancestry when records about her grandparents were nearly all destroyed. Verdie discovered they were both plague victims and her grandfather's involvement with slavery. Her search finally led her to the Unwin estate, where she found out that family once owned hers as slaves and the ornament belonged to her great-grandfather Seth Edu, who was renamed Randolph Harris and brought over from Africa. Verdie resolved to one day trace her family back to its roots, and if she couldn't, she would have her children take over in her place.

Sheriff Ep Bridges
Marmaduke Ephram "Ep" Bridges (pilot, David Huddleston; series, John Crawford) is the Jefferson County sheriff, keeper of the peace in Walton's Mountain. He appeared in forty episodes, starting in the very first. He, like John Walton and Ike Godsey, is a veteran of World War I, serving in the 2nd Infantry Division. After the war he married but became widowed, and has two grown sons. Though he is unquestionably the best man in the county for the sheriff's job, he needs the help of John-Boy's investigative journalism to survive a re-election threat from a charismatic, well-connected politician looking to use the office as a stepping stone to the state legislature. He refuses to discuss his war service until John-Boy researches an "Honor Day" celebration and discovers Ep was decorated for valor with the Medal of Honor, the French Croix de Guerre, and several others for destroying an enemy machine gun nest with a grenade, wounding himself in the process. He was haunted by the deaths he caused. John-Boy's research reunites Ep with Sara Griffith, a volunteer nurse and ambulance driver who treated him for his wounds, but lost touch with him when he was transferred to another hospital. Not long after the reunion, Ep and Sara marry. Sheriff Bridges makes his last appearance in the second-to-last series episode, "The Hostage" (season 9, episode 20).

Sara Griffith Bridges
Sara Griffith (Lynn Carlin) is a Red Cross nurse working in the state capital, to whom John-Boy turns to research Ep Bridges' World War I service. It happens that she served in World War I, and is personally familiar with Ep's service because she treated him after he was wounded. They started a courting relationship, but lost touch when Ep was transferred to another hospital. Sarah visits Walton's Mountain to find Ep, and soon relocates there. After a bit of matchmaking by Olivia and John, Ep proposes and they marry. Her war experience as an ambulance driver gave her a knowledge of how to fix cars, which earns her Jim-Bob's adoration. She, along with Olivia and Corabeth, serves the Baptist church as part of a committee appointed to find a replacement for Reverend Fordwick.

Maude Gormley
Maude (Merie Earle) was an elderly woman who resided on Waltons Mountain. A talented folk artist, she discovered an artistic talent late in life, and began painting local scenes on pieces of plywood (which were later displayed and sold in Ike's store). Though a bit of a schemer, she nonetheless enjoyed a warm friendship with the Walton family, particularly Esther, whom she'd known for many decades.

G.W. Haines
George William "G.W." (David Doremus) is a very soft-spoken, somewhat naive boy who grows into a well-versed gentleman and a kindhearted friend to the Waltons. Initially, he shows an interest in Mary Ellen, but this later tapers away when both of them find complacency as remaining simple friends. Later, G.W.'s attentions fall on Erin as she matures, and this time he falls in love. However, by then, the outbreak of World War II has led him to join the Army, and places him in a troubling environment with many men who are sexually active and act crude and indecently around Erin as he tries to date her while upholding respect and civility where none can be found. G.W. resolves to confess his love for Erin and begin a serious relationship with her, perhaps the first one Erin was privileged to have organically transpire without it being forced upon her abruptly.

Sadly, a disastrous fate befalls G.W. when his kind heart gets the better of him in the season 6 episode "The First Casualty", as he prepared to go into active service. His regiment had been conducting a training exercise with dummy grenades, but for once, switched to live grenades. After pulling the pin on his grenade and preparing to throw it, a wild rabbit emerged onto the training field, right in the area where G.W. was about to lob it. G.W. hesitated for a moment so he could change his trajectory, but the grenade's explosive contents were primed and the time he needed to get the grenade away from himself was lost. As G.W. tossed it up in the air, it exploded too close to him and killed him instantly. His parents were forced to bury him in a way that no one, not even him, had expected, and Erin mourned him deeply. She cried for him both in his death, and after reading a posthumous letter he had prepared for her to receive in case he died in the war, where he told Erin he really loved her, which she reciprocated. Although G.W.'s sudden death haunted Erin, she was comforted by her father in her time of need.

G.W. became the very first resident of Walton's Mountain to die as a result of wartime activities, and the first recurring regular character to be killed off. Erin fondly remembers him in part two of "The Empty Nest", remarking that her now-deceased grandpa is up in Heaven with G.W. and now both will be watching over her.

Flossie Brimmer
A heavyset, widowed woman (Nora Marlowe) who runs the boarding house in Walton's Mountain. Flossie has the ability to tell people's fortunes with tea leaves, and stood watch over the youngest Walton children during the family's childbirths that required them to stay out mischief. 
In the episode, "The Fire Storm", from the fifth season her ability to speak German is pivotal to stopping a book-burning. She prevents the citizens of the Blue Ridge from unknowingly incinerating a Bible printed in German when she identifies it via interpretation, causing the entire community to realize with great horror that some Germans actually valued what they did and their actions nearly copied Nazism. She is the second recurring regular to die, following the sudden death of her actor, Nora Marlowe, in late 1977. Her character is later written out of the series at the same time as Zebulon Walton, having died around the same time he did.

Zuleika Dunbar
An older woman played by Pearl Shear, resident at Flossie Brimmer's boarding house, and known for being a flirt. She is a constant rival for Zeb's affections, and her presence annoys Esther because of it, especially when she tries to upstage her in the season 5 episode "The Rebellion". She takes over the boarding house not long after Mrs Brimmer's death.

Yancy Tucker 
Played by Robert Donner. An all-around handyman, he appears in 19 episodes. "The Sinner" and "The Dust Bowl Cousins" in 1972; "The Deed" and "The Chicken Thief" in 1973; "The Heritage" in 1974, "The Shivaree" in 1975; "The Best Christmas", "The Wedding: Parts 1 and 2", "The Baptism", "The Comeback", "The Quilting" and "The Burnout" in 1976; "The First Casualty" in which he marries  Sissy (Cissy Wellman), "The Grandchild",  and "The Hawk" in 1977; "The Boosters", "The Beau" and "The Obsession" in 1978.  Dinner also portrayed Yancy in two reunion movies, “A Day for Thanks on Walton’s Mountain” (1982) and “A Walton Thanksgiving Reunion” (1993); in the latter, Yancy works with pilot Jim-Bob at the local airport.

J.D. Pickett
Jefferson Davis Pickett (Lewis Arquette) is the owner of a metal products factory that Erin Walton worked at. He was a harsh and stern man, always wanting things done a certain way. He appeared in 11 episodes from 1978 to 1981.

Drew Cutler
Drew (Tony Becker) was first introduced in season 8 as a high school student and friend for Elizabeth. He later works at the Waltons' sawmill and dates Elizabeth. He appeared in 8 episodes from 1980 to 1981 and in 5 of 1982 to 1997 movies.

Rev. Tom Marshall
The new Baptist pastor, Tom (Kip Niven) first appeared in the season 9 episode, "The Beginning" caused quite the sir among the ladies of Waltons Mountain. Later Corabeth attempted to set him up with several women and caused him to realize that he needed to marry and he leaves and returns married to Doris (Joanna Kerns). 
He appeared in three episodes in season 9 and two of 1982 movies.

Other characters

Judge Baldwin
The late father of the Baldwin ladies, who is only ever seen in the form of a portrait above their fireplace, one of many Baldwins to harbor a recipe for bootleg whiskey, and the keeper of a secret room where he stashed his stores of his own brew which his daughters later discovered by accident near the end of the series. He is said to have suffered a stroke at some moment in his declining health and spent the remaining 20 years of his life somewhat vegetated and walking with a cane that is later given by his daughters to Esther following her stroke and return from extensive hospitalization. He was fiercely against the idea of Ashley Longworth getting involved with his daughter Emily and served to quash their relationship in more ways than one. When Emily discovered a note hidden in his portrait reveling in his disgust at her daughter's beau, she "punished" her father by evicting his portrait from its position over the fireplace where it had hung for a decade and temporarily gave him a time-out in the broom closet. Judge Baldwin is widely recognized by the older community of Walton's mountain for his occupation and prestige, as well as his advocacy of the "recipe". In contrast, his late wife is seldom mentioned by his daughters, as their father's legacy was so prolific and authoritative on them compared to their mother, who led a relatively quiet life of hobbies.

Benjamin ("Uncle" Ben) Walton
Uncle Ben Walton was the red-haired, idea-filled older son of Zebulon Tyler Walton and Esther Walton.  He is mentioned in "The Awakening" (season 2, episode 15), in which three children of Zeb and Esther are mentioned, and "The Hero" (season 5, episode 18) when the younger Ben made a memorial bench for Uncle Ben for Honor Day.

Uncle Ben was much like his nephew, John Sr.’s son. They both have red hair, they are both filled with ideas, and their handwriting is similar. Ben got along with John the same way that Ben gets along with John-Boy.

Frances Daly
Frances is Olivia's sister, who lives in Edgemont. She is mentioned in "The Heritage" (season 2, episode 18).

Olivia Hill
Olivia Hill Deborah White is Olivia Walton's namesake (she is daughter of Olivia's deceased childhood best friend Marnie), and is the wife and later widow of Bob Hill, whom she marries on the mountain in "The Shivaree" episode. Catastrophe strikes both her family and her husband's family, as both she and Bob have no surviving parents, and they ended up seeing each other before their wedding, said to be bad luck. This turns out to be strangely prophetic when Olivia is reduced to a bereaved widow barely a year later. She returns to Walton's Mountain following her husband's sudden death in "The Loss.” Bob is said to have been struck by a car a dark night on his way home when he didn't see it coming.

Martha Corinne Walton
Martha Corinne, the widow of Zeb's older brother, Henry Walton, first appears in the two-part season three episode "The Conflict”, in which she and her family are displaced from their scenic mountain land by construction of the Blue Ridge Parkway. Though she initially refuses to leave, when John-Boy is wounded in an armed standoff between members of the Walton clan and government officials, Martha Corinne agrees to relocate to a newly constructed house provided by the government. She appears in two more episodes, including season five's "The Pony Cart.” (which won an Emmy for her portrayer, Beulah Bondi in 1977). It was in this episode she made her final appearance. Martha Corrine reveals to John-Boy that her health has started deteriorating and she had come back to the mountain to make her peace before she eventually passes away.

Boone Walton
Played by Morgan Woodward. A member of the Walton clan, and Zeb's cousin, who had a major role in the standoff with the Blue Ridge Parkway construction. Boone Walton is very set in his ways and has a cantankerous disposition. He first appears in the two-part season three episode "The Conflict,” and is happy with Zeb's involvement in the fight against the government officials. He backs down once John-Boy is shot. He returns in the season seven episode "The Moonshiner,” where he has been arrested for moonshining and faces imprisonment. Jason appears at his sentencing and appeals his case, getting the judge to place Boone in his care after paying off a $100 fine, allowing him to connect with Boone. The rest of his family shows a strong distaste for Boone (due to his role in getting John-Boy injured), especially Esther, who despises his lifestyle. He slowly adjusts among them and manages to restore the Baldwins' Recipe when they lose the means to recreate it from memory. Boone reveals to Jason that he once had a wife named Rose and a young son, but a freak flash flood took their lives. Although Boone stubbornly resists progress and continues to rebel, he reforms himself in the end. However, he remains an ardent moonshiner for the rest of his days on the mountain until one fateful night much later at the ripe age of 85, when he treks out into civilization with two jugs of moonshine in hand and dies crossing the road in the dark (implied to possibly be drunk), where he is hit by an oncoming car.

Sarah Simmonds
Sarah Jane Simmonds is an overly protected young girl being raised by her widowed mother. When John-Boy asks her out to see a movie it releases a wild streak that results in a close brush with death for Sarah. Played by Sissy Spacek, in one of her first television roles.

References

Further reading
 Ike Godsey of Walton's Mountain, by Joe Conley. Albany, BearManor Media 2010. .

External links
 
 Encyclopedia of Television
 Walton's Mountain Museum official website
 All About The Waltons
 The Waltons website
 A Walk with Grandpa Walton and the Walton family
 The Walton's Mountain Community Center
 Rockfish-river.com – German / English Website with travel report and video about Walton's Mountain Museum
 The Waltons Unofficial Home Page. Also home of the Waltons Digest
 "A Tribute To The Waltons" – cast interviews

Lists of drama television characters
Lists of American television series characters
The Waltons